() is an Irish language novel by Máirtín Ó Cadhain. It was first published in 1949. It is considered one of the greatest novels written in the Irish language.

Title
Cré na Cille literally means "Earth of the Church"; it has also been translated as Graveyard Clay, Graveyard Soil, Graveyard Earth, Church and Clay and The Dirty Dust.

Overview 
The novel is written almost entirely as conversation between the dead in a Connemara graveyard. The talk is full of gossip, backbiting, flirting, feuds, and scandal-mongering.

Reception 
The novel is considered a masterpiece of 20th Century Irish literature and has drawn comparisons to the work of Flann O’Brien, Samuel Beckett and James Joyce. In its serialised form, Cré na Cille was read aloud and gained classic status among Irish speakers. Cian Ó hÉigeartaigh, co-author of Sáirséal agus Dill, 1947-1981, claims that it invigorated the revival of Irish language writing in the 20th Century.

Publication History 
Cré na Cille was serialised by the newspaper The Irish Press and then published by Sáirséal agus Dill in 1949.

It was translated into Norwegian by Professor Jan Erik Rekdal and published in 1995 by Gyldendal Norsk Forlag as Kirkegårdsjord - gjenfortellinger i ti mellomspill, and translated into Danish by Ole Munch-Pedersen and published in 2000 by Husets Forlag as Kirkegårdsjord - genfortælling i ti mellemspil.

Two English translations of the novel were published in 2016 by Yale University Press and Cló Iar-Chonnacht. The first translation, The Dirty Dust, is by Professor Alan Titley, the second, Graveyard Clay, by Liam Mac Con Iomaire and the British cartographer Tim Robinson. An earlier translation by Joan Keefe was completed in 1984 as a doctoral dissertation, but never published.

The lack of an English translation for such a long period of time after the book’s first publication became part of its renown and was a matter of speculation. Three early attempts at translation by Sáirséal agus Dill were thwarted, the first when the young woman selected as the translator joined a convent, the second by the refusal of the poet Thomas Kinsella and the third by an unsatisfactory effort by a former prison-mate of Ó Cadhain’s.

Media Adaptations

Radio 
A dramatised version of the novel was broadcast on RTÉ Raidió na Gaeltachta in 1973, and was revised and rebroadcast in 2006 as part of RTÉ’s Ó Cadhain centenary celebrations.

Theatre 
The novel was adapted for the stage by Macdara Ó Fátharta and was performed in 1996 and 2006. The role of Caitríona Pháidín was played by Bríd Ní Neachtain. The action was dramatised “in a cavernous space, with characters appearing from alcoves to interact with Caitríona, before slowly drifting back into the dimly lit set - reminding us that these people are gradually merging with the graveyard clay”. Bríd Ní Neachtain was nominated for an Irish Times Theatre Award for her performance in the play.

Film 
A film adaptation, directed by Robert Quinn, was released in 2007. Like the stage play, it was written by Macdara Ó Fatharta and starred Bríd Ní Neachtain.

References List 

1949 novels
20th-century Irish novels
Irish-language literature
Irish novels adapted into plays
Irish novels adapted into films